Claude Melki (1939–1994) was a French actor.

Selected filmography
 Line of Sight (1960)

References

External links 

 

1939 births
1994 deaths
People from Saint-Denis, Seine-Saint-Denis
French male film actors
French male stage actors
20th-century French male actors